William Fulton (born 6 December 1916) was a boxer who competed in the 1934 British Empire Games in London, England and the 1938 British Empire Games in Sydney, Australia, representing Southern Rhodesia. He was born at Golden Kopje Mine, Sinoia. In 1938, he won bronze in the lightweight division after winning his bronze medal fight over J. Ellis of Australia. Previously, Fulton defeated Joseph Collins of New Zealand in a quarter-final contest before losing his semi-final bout to Harry Groves of England. Fulton also won a bronze medal in the 1934 British Empire Games in the featherweight category, defeating McGregor of Scotland before losing to Charles Catterall of South Africa and then recovering to win the bronze medal bout over Sammy Tomlinson of Canada.

References

1916 births
Year of death missing
Sportspeople from Chinhoyi
White Rhodesian people
Featherweight boxers
Lightweight boxers
Rhodesian male boxers
Boxers at the 1934 British Empire Games
Boxers at the 1938 British Empire Games
Commonwealth Games bronze medallists for Southern Rhodesia
Commonwealth Games medallists in boxing
Medallists at the 1934 British Empire Games
Medallists at the 1938 British Empire Games